A pancake lens is colloquial term for a flat, thin camera lens assembly (short barrel). The majority are a prime lens of normal or slightly wider angle of view. Some are zoom lenses.

Motivation 
Pancake lenses are primarily valued for providing quality optics in a compact package. The resulting camera and lens assembly may even be small enough to be pocketable, a design feature which is usually impractical with conventional SLR bodies and lens assemblies.  Pancake lenses can be very short and flat because they do not need large amounts of optical correction, i.e. extra lens elements. 

The problem arises when such lenses have too short a focal length to fit in front of the retractable mirrors used in reflex cameras. In such a situation, a pancake lens focuses in front of, rather than on, the focal plane (film or light sensor) of the camera.  This has necessitated the design of retrofocus lenses that refocus the image farther back, which is why such lenses are longer and bulkier than their "pancake" equivalents.

Pancake-style prime lenses are generally simpler to manufacture than pancake zoom lenses like Sony E PZ 16-50mm F3.5-5.6 due to the general lack of an internal micromotor and fewer image correcting elements, allowing for a thinner profile. Because of this limitation, pancake zoom lenses are much less common.

While there is no specific size and weight in defining a pancake lens, most are light-weight and no more than a few centimeters in length. This varies greatly depending upon the lens' build quality, focal length, and maximum aperture.

Body-cap lenses 
A body-cap lens is an extreme type of pancake lens that is designed to both protect the camera internals as a body cap normally would, yet still allow the user to take photos. These lenses generally have no more than a couple optical lens elements, no image correcting elements, a very-slow fixed aperture, an extremely thin focusing ring (if any), and a retractable lens element cover. Due to this compromise in design, body-cap lenses generally suffer from numerous image quality issues such as heavy vignetting and poor image sharpness.

Examples of body-cap lenses include the Olympus Body Cap Lens 15mm f/8 and the Fujifilm XM-FL 24mm f/8.

History 
In the 1960s and 1970s the Nikon GN lens was a notable example, while in the 1970s and 1980s pancake lenses were used in compact single lens reflex (SLR) cameras.

Throughout the 2010s, the design has seen a resurgence due to the growth of the mirrorless interchangeable-lens digital camera market. Pancake lenses have increasingly become lighter and feature thinner profiles than years past.

List of pancake lenses

References

External links 
 List of all pancake lenses by camera format

Photographic lens designs